Rasul may refer to:

Rasūl, an Islamic messenger or prophet
Rasul (Universal Sufism), an evening prayer
Rasul (given name)
Rasul (surname)
Rasul, Punjab, a Union Council of Mandi Bahauddin District in Pakistan
"Rasul", a song by Spyro Gyra from Morning Dance

See also
Rasul v. Bush, a 2004 landmark United States Supreme Court decision
Rhassoul, a natural mineral clay used in bodily cleansing